In Yoruba religion, Orungan was the son of Yemaja and Aganju.

He ravished his mother once, and as he tried a second time, Yemaja fell and burst open, whereupon the fifteen Orishas came forth from her.

References

Yoruba gods
Traditional African religions
Yoruba mythology